Medium, Rare & Remastered is a compilation album of rarities and remastered tracks by the Irish rock band U2. It was released exclusively to subscribing members of U2.com, replacing U2 Go Home: Live From Slane Castle on 22 February 2009. The double CD features tracks that were released as part of The Complete U2 digital box set, the bonus discs on the remastered albums to date, and some readily available single B-sides. 
The cover art was from the Passengers project in 1995. The original photo featured main U2 producer Brian Eno, who also was involved in this project, but for this album, he was edited out of the photo.

Track listing

References

Albums produced by Brian Eno
U2 compilation albums
2009 compilation albums
Universal Music Group compilation albums
Albums produced by Daniel Lanois
B-side compilation albums